The Second Virginia Charter, also known as the Charter of 1609 (dated May 23, 1609), is a document that provided "a further Enlargement and Explanation of the said [first] Grant, Privileges, and Liberties", which gave the London Company adventurers influence in determining the policies of the company, extended the Company's rights to land extending "up into the Land throughout from Sea to Sea", and allowed English merchant companies and individuals to invest in the colonization effort. The charter includes a detailed list of the names of some 650 noblemen, gentlemen, officials, companies, and individuals who subscribed as investors.

Land granted
The company was granted 200 miles of coastline, south from Cape Comfort, as well as all the land stretching from this coastline to the Pacific and Arctic Ocean.

See also
 First Virginia Charter

References

Colony of Virginia
Thirteen Colonies documents
17th-century documents
1609 works